The Schuyler County Courthouse Complex is a historic courthouse complex located on North Frankln Street between 9th and 10th Streets in Watkins Glen in Schuyler County, New York. It consists of a three building government complex. The courthouse, built in 1855, is a two-story, rectangular brick building on a stone foundation. It features an inset square tower with an ogee roof and weather vane.  It also has a small pedimented porch supported by Doric order columns.  The Sheriff's residence is a two-story brick structure with hipped roof and cupola.  The third building is the one story Clerk's office that measures 22 feet by 38 feet.

It was listed on the National Register of Historic Places in 1974.

Gallery

See also
National Register of Historic Places listings in Schuyler County, New York

References
Notes

External links

Courthouses on the National Register of Historic Places in New York (state)
County courthouses in New York (state)
Government buildings completed in 1855
Buildings and structures in Schuyler County, New York
National Register of Historic Places in Schuyler County, New York